Sochaczew railway station is a railway station serving the town of Sochaczew, in the Masovian Voivodeship, Poland. The station opened in 1902 and is located on the Warsaw–Kunowice railway and now closed Sochaczew–Plecewice railway. The train services are operated by PKP and Koleje Mazowieckie.

History

The station was built between 1900 and 1902 according to a design by Czesław Domaniewski on the broad gauge Warsaw–Kalisz Railway. In 1914 the line rebuilt to standard gauge and in 1916, the line became double track. The section from Błonie to Sochaczew was electrified in 1959 and in 1961 the next section to Kutno was electrified. The electrification of the E20 line was completed in 1988. In 1992 the modernisation of the section Warsaw - Poznan started, with the task to adapt the E20 route to a driving speed of 160 km/h. On the section Sochaczew - Łowicz permissible maximum speed is 120 km/h and on the section Błonie - Sochaczew - 160 km/h.

Modernisation
In October 2015 renovation of the station, including the renovation of the main entrance and the replacement of windows and doors throughout the building was started.

Train services
The station is served by the following service(s):

Intercity services Szczecin - Stargard - Krzyz - Poznan - Kutno - Lowicz - Warsaw - Lublin - Rzeszow - Przemysl
Intercity services Wroclaw - Ostrow Wielkopolskie - Jarocin - Poznan - Kutno - Lowicz - Warsaw
Intercity services Kolobrzeg - Pila - Bydgoszcz - Torun - Kutno - Lowicz - Warsaw
Intercity services Gorzow Wielkopolskie - Krzyz - Pila - Bydgoszcz - Torun - Kutno - Lowicz - Warsaw
Intercity services Szczecin - Pila - Bydgoszcz - Torun - Kutno - Lowicz - Warsaw - Lublin - Rzeszow - Przemysl
Intercity services Gdynia - Gdansk - Bydgoszcz - Torun - Kutno - Lowicz - Warsaw - Lublin - Rzeszow - Zagorz/Przemysl
Regional services (KM) Kutno - Lowicz - Sochaczew - Blonie - Warsaw
Regional services (KM) Lowicz - Sochaczew - Blonie - Warsaw - Minsk Mazowiecki

References

Station article at kolej.one.pl
 This article is based upon a translation of the Polish language version as of July 2016.

External links

Railway stations in Poland opened in 1902
Railway stations in Masovian Voivodeship
Railway stations served by Koleje Mazowieckie
Sochaczew County